Lavinia Agache (later Carney; born 11 February 1968) is a retired Romanian artistic gymnast. She won 10 medals at major international events, including a team gold medal at the 1984 Olympics and three silver medals at the 1983 World Championships (team, vault and uneven bars). She is also the 1983 European champion on balance beam.

Gymnastics career
Agache took up gymnastics aged seven with Mihai Agoston and Maria Cosma. She was then coached by Béla and Márta Károlyi before their defection to the United States, and later by Octavian Bellu, Adrian Goreac and Maria Cosma. She won the all-around bronze at the 1980 Junior European Championships and the 1981 International Japan Junior Invitational.

In 1981, thirteen year old Agache was entered to compete in the International Gymnastics Classic in Los Angeles under the name Ekaterina Szabo. Szabo was another gymnast on the Romanian team.  The reason for the deception is unclear because Agache could have competed under her own name if Romanian gymnastics officials had simply entered her into the competition.  Both Agache and Szabo were well-known to international gymnastics officials and judges, which made the attempt to pass off Agache as Szabo even more baffling. She tied Julianne McNamara for second place, but her scores were invalidated after the competition. Three years later, Agache and Szabo were both on the gold medal winning Romanian team at the 1984 Olympics.

Agache won three individual medals at the 1983 World Championships (silver on vault and uneven bars; bronze on beam) and a team silver medal, and four medals at the 1983 European Championships (gold on beam, silver in the all-around and on uneven bars, and bronze on vault). At the 1984 Olympics in Los Angeles, in addition to the team gold medal, she won the bronze medal on vault. This was a disappointing medal toll for Agache, however, as she had the opportunity to win medals on every event and in the all-around after winning the compulsory round of team competition, but suffered falls on three of the four events during the optional rounds (bars, beam, and floor). She semi-retired in 1984 after a knee injury, but returned in 1991 to compete in the first World Professional Championships. After that she participated in numerous gymnastics shows in the United States, and eventually married and became a gymnastics coach there. Lavinia is married to Manuel Ramos jr., an ENT doctor, and has four nieces. One of her nieces was a competitive gymnast who later switched to diving.

References

External links

 

1968 births
Living people
People from Bacău County
Romanian female artistic gymnasts
Olympic gymnasts of Romania
Olympic gold medalists for Romania
Olympic bronze medalists for Romania
Olympic medalists in gymnastics
Gymnasts at the 1984 Summer Olympics
Medalists at the World Artistic Gymnastics Championships
European champions in gymnastics
Medalists at the 1984 Summer Olympics